This article lists political parties in Barbados.

Barbados has a two-party system, which means that there are two dominant political parties, with extreme difficulty for anybody to achieve electoral success under the banner of any other party. Occasionally various members of political parties in Barbados have used an option of crossing the floor.

The parties

Major parties

Others
People's Empowerment Party (PEP)
Clement Payne Movement (CPM)
Pan-Caribbean Congress (PCP)
Bajan Free Party (BFP)
Solutions Barbados (SB)
United Progressive Party (Barbados) (UPP)
People's Democratic Congress (Barbados) (PDC)
Kingdom Government of Barbados (KGB)
New Barbados Kingdom Alliance (NBKA)
Barbados Integrity Movement (BIM)
Barbados Sovereignty Party (BSP)
Alliance Party for Progress (APP)

Defunct
Barbados National Party (BNP)
National Democratic Party (NDP)
People's Political Alliance (PPA)
People's Progressive Movement (PPM)
Worker's Party of Barbados (WPB)
Barbados Electors Association (BEA)
West Indian National Congress Party (CP)
Citizens Action Partnership (CAP)
Progressive Conservative Party (PCP)
Coalition of United Parties (CUP)

Names in italics denote Electoral Alliances

References

See also
 Politics of Barbados
 List of political parties by country

Barbados
 
Political parties
Political parties
Political parties
Barbados